Alessandro Messina (30 August 1941 – 20 August 2022) was a Canadian cyclist. He competed in the individual road race at the 1960 Summer Olympics.

References

External links
 

1941 births
2022 deaths
Canadian male cyclists
Olympic cyclists of Canada
Cyclists at the 1960 Summer Olympics
People from Rijeka
Sportspeople from Rijeka
Italians of Croatia
Italian emigrants to Canada